Ivor Ichikowitz (born September 1966) is a South African businessman, founder and executive chairman of Paramount Group. He is also an executive chairman of TransAfrica Capital and the Ichikowitz Family Foundation.

Early life and education
Ichikowitz was born in the mining town of Springs, South Africa, where he experienced first-hand the country's transition. His father, Louis, imported Suzuki motorcycles, setting the foundation on which Ichikowitz would later build his own company.

Ichikowitz studied drama at the University of the Witwatersrand in Johannesburg, South Africa. During his time at university he became involved with protest theatre, before travelling throughout Africa and studying African literature.

Career 
During the past twenty years, Ichikowitz has developed a number of businesses including defence and aerospace, mining, oil and gas, agriculture and sustainable development, property, retail and tourism.

Ichikowitz founded the Paramount Group in 1994, to operate in the global defence, internal security and peacekeeping industries. The group operates in countries in the Middle East, South America and Africa, as well as in India. It manufactures a range of armoured vehicles and deals in surplus South African military equipment, including fighter aircraft.

In 2011 the Paramount Group launched the Advanced High Performance Reconnaissance Light Aircraft, due to take its first flight in 2013.

In addition to his role at Paramount Group, Ichikowitz is the executive chairman of private equity group TransAfrica Capital, which invests in scientific research and development projects.

Controversy 
Ichikowitz has been criticised for being a "close ally" of the ruling African National Congress (ANC), and for providing President Jacob Zuma with an aircraft to use for an ANC fundraising and business trip to Lebanon and Kazakhstan. Another flight by Zuma to the United States on an aircraft owned by Ichikowitz in 2011 caused considerable controversy when the cost (R6.3 million) was questioned in parliament. The official presidential aircraft, operated by the South African Air Force, was not available for the flight.

Ichikowitz has also been criticised for his involvement in the controversial Oil-for-Food Programme in the aftermath of the Gulf War.

During September 2020 Ichikowitz and his company Paramount were listed in the FinCEN Files for various SAR (Suspicious Activety Reports) by the US Dept of Treasury for suspicious and corrupt transactions including possible money laundering exceeding $250m.

Philanthropic interests 
Ichikowitz is the founder of the Ichikowitz Family Foundation, established in 2010. The Foundation is actively involved in wildlife conservation of endangered species, especially the protection of Africa's rhinos and elephant population.

Personal life 
Ichikowitz is married with two children.

References

External links
Ivor Ichikowitz Official Website
Ichikowitz Family Foundation

1966 births
Living people
South African businesspeople